The 1983 Daihatsu Challenge was a women's tennis tournament played on indoor carpet courts at the Brighton Centre in Brighton, England that was part of the 1983 Virginia Slims World Championship Series. It was the sixth edition of the tournament and was held from 17 October until 23 October 1983. First-seeded Chris Evert-Lloyd won the singles title and earned $28,000 first-prize money.

Finals

Singles
 Chris Evert-Lloyd defeated  Jo Durie 6–1, 6–1
 It was Evert's 5th singles title of the year and the 125th of her career.

Doubles
 Chris Evert-Lloyd /  Pam Shriver defeated  Jo Durie /  Ann Kiyomura 7–5, 6–4
 It was Evert's 6th title of the year and the 7th of her career. It was Shriver's 13th title of the year and the 47th of her career.

Prize money

References

External links
 International Tennis Federation (ITF) tournament event details
 Tournament draws

Daihatsu Challenge
Brighton International
Daihatsu Challenge
Daihatsu Challenge
Daihatsu Challenge